Murat Kurum (born Ankara, 1976) is a Turkish engineer, technocrat, and incumbent of the Ministry of Environment and Urbanization.

After completing coursework at the Ankara Mimar Kemal High School, he graduated from Selçuk University, Faculty of Engineering and Architecture, Department of Civil Engineering in 1999. Between 1999 and 2005, he worked as an engineer, site manager and coordinator in various private organizations operating in the field of construction.

Between 2005 and 2006, he worked as an expert at the Mass Housing Development Administration Ankara Implementation Department. Between 2006 and 2009, he worked as the European Side Implementation Branch Manager of TOKİ Istanbul Implementation Department Emlak Konut GYO A.Ş., a subsidiary of TR Prime Ministry Mass Housing Administration, since 2009. He served as General Manager and member of the board of directors. He was appointed as the Minister of Environment and Urbanization on July 10, 2018.

Murat Kurum is married and has three children.

References

Members of the 66th government of Turkey
Selçuk University alumni
Turkish civil engineers
Living people
1976 births